Goulds is an unincorporated community and census-designated place (CDP) in Miami-Dade County, Florida, United States. The area was originally populated as the result of a stop on the Florida East Coast Railroad. The railroad depot was located near the current Southwest 224th Street. The community was named after its operator, Lyman Gould, who cut trees for railroad ties. As of the 2020 census, the population stood at 11,446, up from 10,103 in 2010.

History
The area that became Goulds was settled in 1900 by homesteaders. It received its name when the Florida East Coast Railway built a siding in 1903, operated by an employee of the railroad named Lyman Goulds. It was first known as "Gould's Siding", and later shortened to Goulds. Many packing houses were built along the Old Dixie Highway. Early on, Goulds had a reputation as a rough town, with several saloons serving itinerant field workers. Most of the packing houses were destroyed by a tornado in 1919, or the 1926 Miami Hurricane, but were rebuilt. Cauley Square, a former railway town located in Goulds, was restored by Mary Ann Ballard after she purchased the village in 1949.

Geography
It is bordered to the north by South Miami Heights, to the northeast by Cutler Bay, and to the south by Princeton.

U.S. Route 1 (Dixie Highway) is the main road through the community.

Demographics

2020 census

As of the 2020 United States census, there were 11,446 people, 3,350 households, and 2,729 families residing in the CDP.

2010 census
As of the census of 2010, there were 10,103 people, 2,987 households, and 2,391 families residing in the CDP. The racial makeup of the CDP was 39.1% White 55.2% African American, 0.2% Native American, 0.6% Asian, 0.01% Pacific Islander, 3.48% from other races, and 2.46% from two or more races. Hispanic or Latino of any race were 41.0% of the population.
 
There were 2,987 households, out of which 42.4% had children under the age of 18 living with them, 35.5% were married couples living together, 35.5% had a female householder with no husband present, and 20.0% were non-families. 20.0% of all households were made up of individuals, and 15.9% had someone living alone who was 65 years of age or older. The average household size was 3.36 and the average family size was 3.71.

In the CDP, the population was spread out, with 35.7% under the age of 20, 14.2% from 20 to 29, 13.6% from 30 to 39, 27.3% from 40 to 64, and 9.0% who were 65 years of age or older.  The median age was 30 years old. The female population stood at 5,370 while for males at 4,733.

The median income for a household in the CDP was $33,200, and the median income for a family was $35,374. Males had a median income of $26,822 versus $25,265 for females. The per capita income for the CDP was $12,259. About 31.2% of families and 37.8% of the population were below the poverty line, including 47.9% of those under age 18 and 27.4% of those age 65 or over.

As of 2010, speakers of English as a first language accounted for 54.4% of residents, while Spanish made up 41.8%, and other languages were at 3.6% of the population.

Education
The Miami-Dade County Public Schools district serves Goulds.

References

Census-designated places in Miami-Dade County, Florida
Census-designated places in Florida